Lucas Gabriel López García  (born 13 January 1988) is an Argentine professional footballer who plays as an attacking midfielder for Greek Super League 2 club Apollon Larissa.

His first match as a professional football player and his first match in Liga I was played for Ceahlăul Piatra Neamţ against Sportul Studențesc București.

Career

Ceahlaul
At Ceahlăul he was nicknamed "Messi in Ceahlaul" and the press rumored that Steaua București was interested to transfer him.

Inter Turku
On 13 June 2016, García moved to Inter Turku on an 18-month contract.

Honours
Inter Turku
Finnish Cup: 2017–18
Volos
Football League: 2018–19

References

External links

1988 births
Living people
Argentine footballers
Association football defenders
Torneo Argentino B players
Liga I players
Veikkausliiga players
Football League (Greece) players
Super League Greece 2 players
Guaraní Antonio Franco footballers
CSM Ceahlăul Piatra Neamț players
FC Honka players
FC Inter Turku players
Niki Volos F.C. players
Volos N.F.C. players
Apollon Larissa F.C. players
Argentine expatriate footballers
Expatriate footballers in Romania
Expatriate footballers in Finland
Expatriate footballers in Greece
Argentine expatriate sportspeople in Romania
Argentine expatriate sportspeople in Finland
Argentine expatriate sportspeople in Greece